The Neslen Formation is a geologic formation in Utah. It preserves fossils dating back to the Cretaceous period. It has been exploited for coal. The Kaiparowits Formation is closely associated.

Only two specimens have been reported from the formation. The first is a diagnostic tyrannosaur foot, the second being the type and only specimen of Rhinorex.

See also

 List of fossiliferous stratigraphic units in Utah
 Paleontology in Utah

References

Geologic formations of Utah
Cretaceous System of North America